The 1999 Chicago White Sox season was the White Sox's 100th season. They finished with a record of 75-86, good enough for 2nd place in the American League Central, 21.5 games behind the 1st place Cleveland Indians.

Offseason 
 November 11, 1998: Paul Konerko was traded by the Cincinnati Reds to the Chicago White Sox for Mike Cameron.

Regular season

Season standings

Game log 

|- bgcolor="ccffcc"
| 1 || April 5 || @ Mariners || 8–2 || Baldwin (1–0) || Fassero || — || 51,656 || 1–0
|- bgcolor="ccffcc"
| 2 || April 6 || @ Mariners || 11–3 || Parque (1–0) || Moyer || — || 20,435 || 2–0
|- bgcolor="ffbbbb"
| 3 || April 7 || @ Mariners || 3–7 || Garcia || Snyder (0–1) || Mesa || 21,050 || 2–1
|- bgcolor="ffbbbb"
| 4 || April 9 || Royals || 5–10 || Barber || Sirotka (0–1) || — || 26,243 || 2–2
|- bgcolor="ffbbbb"
| 5 || April 10 || Royals || 4–9 || Pittsley || Navarro (0–1) || Service || 11,908 || 2–3
|- bgcolor="ffbbbb"
| 6 || April 11 || Royals || 1–3 || Appier || Baldwin (1–1) || Montgomery || 10,503 || 2–4
|- bgcolor="ffbbbb"
| 7 || April 13 || @ Red Sox || 0–6 || Saberhagen || Parque (1–1) || — || 31,874 || 2–5
|- bgcolor="ccffcc"
| 8 || April 15 || @ Red Sox || 4–0 || Snyder (1–1) || Martinez || — || 22,461 || 3–5
|- bgcolor="ffbbbb"
| 9 || April 16 || @ Royals || 2–7 || Appier || Sirotka (0–2) || — || 11,326 || 3–6
|- bgcolor="ccffcc"
| 10 || April 17 || @ Royals || 6–5 || Lowe (1–0) || Montgomery || Howry (1) || 11,766 || 4–6
|- bgcolor="ccffcc"
| 11 || April 18 || @ Royals || 7–5 || Baldwin (2–1) || Barber || Howry (2) || 18,529 || 5–6
|- bgcolor="ccffcc"
| 12 || April 20 || Mariners || 3–1 || Parque (2–1) || Fassero || Howry (3) || 8,980 || 6–6
|- bgcolor="ccffcc"
| 13 || April 21 || Mariners || 2–1 || Snyder (2–1) || Paniagua || Howry (4) || 9,405 || 7–6
|- bgcolor="ccffcc"
| 14 || April 23 || Tigers || 5–0 || Sirotka (1–2) || Blair || — || 9,837 || 8–6
|- bgcolor="ccffcc"
| 15 || April 24 || Tigers || 3–1 || Navarro (1–1) || Mlicki || Howry (5) || 11,264 || 9–6
|- bgcolor="ffbbbb"
| 16 || April 25 || Tigers || 4–9 || Weaver || Baldwin (2–2) || — || 15,370 || 9–7
|- bgcolor="ccffcc"
| 17 || April 28 || Devil Rays || 10–7 || Parque (3–1) || Rekar || Howry (6) || — || 10–7
|- bgcolor="ccffcc"
| 18 || April 28 || Devil Rays || 9–1 || Snyder (3–1) || Saunders || — || 10,300 || 11–7
|- bgcolor="ffbbbb"
| 19 || April 29 || Devil Rays || 1–4 || Alvarez || Sirotka (1–3) || Hernandez || 10,022 || 11–8
|- bgcolor="ffbbbb"
| 20 || April 30 || @ Angels || 1–3 || Petkovsek || Navarro (1–2) || Percival || 35,053 || 11–9
|-

|- bgcolor="ccffcc"
| 21 || May 1 || @ Angels || 8–5 || Lundquist (1–0) || Percival || Howry (7) || 35,296 || 12–9
|- bgcolor="ffbbbb"
| 22 || May 2 || @ Angels || 3–6 || Olivares || Parque (3–2) || — || 34,737 || 12–10
|- bgcolor="ccffcc"
| 23 || May 3 || @ Angels || 8–1 || Snyder (4–1) || Belcher || — || 31,995 || 13–10
|- bgcolor="ffbbbb"
| 24 || May 4 || @ Orioles || 5–9 (10) || Timlin || Lundquist (1–1) || — || 37,846 || 13–11
|- bgcolor="ffbbbb"
| 25 || May 5 || @ Orioles || 0–8 || Guzman || Navarro (1–3) || — || 40,081 || 13–12
|- bgcolor="ffbbbb"
| 26 || May 6 || @ Orioles || 2–4 || Ponson || Baldwin (2–3) || Timlin || 36,880 || 13–13
|- bgcolor="ccffcc"
| 27 || May 7 || Athletics || 7–1 || Parque (4–2) || Candiotti || — || 11,181 || 14–13
|- bgcolor="ccffcc"
| 28 || May 8 || Athletics || 5–3 || Snyder (5–1) || Haynes || Howry (8) || 15,489 || 15–13
|- bgcolor="ffbbbb"
| 29 || May 9 || Athletics || 0–3 || Oquist || Sirotka (1–4) || Jones || 12,652 || 15–14
|- bgcolor="ccffcc"
| 30 || May 10 || Rangers || 5–2 || Navarro (2–3) || Helling || — || 12,670 || 16–14
|- bgcolor="ffbbbb"
| 31 || May 11 || Rangers || 5–11 || Zimmerman || Howry (0–1) || — || 10,905 || 16–15
|- bgcolor="ccffcc"
| 32 || May 14 || @ Yankees || 8–2 || Parque (5–2) || Hernandez || Simas (1) || 33,793 || 17–15
|- bgcolor="ccffcc"
| 33 || May 15 || @ Yankees || 12–4 || Snyder (6–1) || Mendoza || — || 45,824 || 18–15
|- bgcolor="ffbbbb"
| 34 || May 16 || @ Yankees || 1–2 || Pettitte || Sirotka (1–5) || Rivera || 51,046 || 18–16
|- bgcolor="ffbbbb"
| 35 || May 17 || Indians || 9–13 || Colon || Navarro (2–4) || — || 17,101 || 18–17
|- bgcolor="ffbbbb"
| 36 || May 18 || Indians || 0–13 || Gooden || Baldwin (2–4) || — || 13,429 || 18–18
|- bgcolor="ffbbbb"
| 37 || May 19 || Indians || 7–13 || Nagy || Parque (5–3) || — || 14,854 || 18–19
|- bgcolor="ffbbbb"
| 38 || May 22 || Yankees || 2–10 || Clemens || Snyder (6–2) || — || — || 18–20
|- bgcolor="ccffcc"
| 39 || May 22 || Yankees || 2–1 || Sirotka (2–5) || Pettitte || Simas (2) || 35,310 || 19–20
|- bgcolor="ffbbbb"
| 40 || May 23 || Yankees || 7–8 (10) || Rivera || Simas (0–1) || — || 22,845 || 19–21
|- bgcolor="ccffcc"
| 41 || May 24 || @ Indians || 10–3 || Lowe (2–0) || Gooden || — || 43,208 || 20–21
|- bgcolor="ffbbbb"
| 42 || May 25 || @ Indians || 1–3 || Nagy || Parque (5–4) || Jackson || 42,161 || 20–22
|- bgcolor="ffbbbb"
| 43 || May 26 || @ Indians || 2–6 || Burba || Sirotka (2–6) || Shuey || 43,228 || 20–23
|- bgcolor="ffbbbb"
| 44 || May 27 || @ Tigers || 5–10 || Weaver || Snyder (6–3) || — || 13,465 || 20–24
|- bgcolor="ccffcc"
| 45 || May 28 || @ Tigers || 9–1 || Navarro (3–4) || Thompson || — || 20,437 || 21–24
|- bgcolor="ccffcc"
| 46 || May 29 || @ Tigers || 7–1 || Baldwin (3–4) || Moehler || — || 27,821 || 22–24
|- bgcolor="ffbbbb"
| 47 || May 30 || @ Tigers || 2–3 || Mlicki || Parque (5–5) || Jones || 20,263 || 22–25
|-

|- bgcolor="ccffcc"
| 48 || June 1 || @ Blue Jays || 6–2 || Sirotka (3–6) || Escobar || — || 20,399 || 23–25
|- bgcolor="ffbbbb"
| 49 || June 2 || @ Blue Jays || 7–9 || Carpenter || Snyder (6–4) || Koch || 22,197 || 23–26
|- bgcolor="ccffcc"
| 50 || June 3 || @ Blue Jays || 10–3 || Navarro (4–4) || Hentgen || — || 33,673 || 24–26
|- bgcolor="ffbbbb"
| 51 || June 4 || Pirates || 3–6 (11) || Wilkins || Simas (0–2) || — || 12,238 || 24–27
|- bgcolor="ccffcc"
| 52 || June 5 || Pirates || 6–5 || Parque (6–5) || Benson || Foulke (1) || 20,066 || 25–27
|- bgcolor="ccffcc"
| 53 || June 6 || Pirates || 4–3 || Sirotka (4–6) || Silva || Howry (9) || 26,827 || 26–27
|- bgcolor="ffbbbb"
| 54 || June 7 || Astros || 2–8 || Lima || Snyder (6–5) || — || 16,881 || 26–28
|- bgcolor="ccffcc"
| 55 || June 8 || Astros || 4–3 || Navarro (5–4) || Reynolds || Howry (10) || 11,836 || 27–28
|- bgcolor="ffbbbb"
| 56 || June 9 || Astros || 4–13 || Hampton || Baldwin (3–5) || — || 12,138 || 27–29
|- bgcolor="ccffcc"
| 57 || June 11 || @ Cubs || 5–3 (6) || Parque (7–5) || Lieber || — || 38,989 || 28–29
|- bgcolor="ccffcc"
| 58 || June 12 || @ Cubs || 8–2 || Sirotka (5–6) || Trachsel || — || 38,146 || 29–29
|- bgcolor="ccffcc"
| 59 || June 13 || @ Cubs || 6–4 || Simas (1–2) || Aguilera || Foulke (2) || 38,071 || 30–29
|- bgcolor="ccffcc"
| 60 || June 14 || Devil Rays || 9–7 || Snyder (7–5) || Alvarez || Howry (11) || 15,457 || 31–29
|- bgcolor="ffbbbb"
| 61 || June 15 || Devil Rays || 2–3 || Rupe || Baldwin (3–6) || Hernandez || 11,347 || 31–30
|- bgcolor="ccffcc"
| 62 || June 16 || Devil Rays || 3–2 (11) || Lowe (3–0) || Charlton || — || 10,903 || 32–30
|- bgcolor="ccffcc"
| 63 || June 17 || Orioles || 9–3 || Sirotka (6–6) || Guzman || Foulke (3) || 16,496 || 33–30
|- bgcolor="ffbbbb"
| 64 || June 18 || Orioles || 2–3 || Mussina || Navarro (5–5) || — || 17,098 || 33–31
|- bgcolor="ffbbbb"
| 65 || June 19 || Orioles || 9–11 (11) || Rhodes || Foulke (0–1) || Kamieniecki || 30,232 || 33–32
|- bgcolor="ffbbbb"
| 66 || June 20 || Orioles || 4–8 || Johnson || Baldwin (3–7) || Timlin || 22,755 || 33–33
|- bgcolor="ccffcc"
| 67 || June 22 || Twins || 6–1 || Parque (8–5) || Hawkins || — || 12,428 || 34–33
|- bgcolor="ffbbbb"
| 68 || June 23 || Twins || 10–12 || Sampson || Sirotka (6–7) || Trombley || 14,770 || 34–34
|- bgcolor="ccffcc"
| 69 || June 24 || Twins || 5–3 || Navarro (6–5) || Radke || Howry (12) || 13,246 || 35–34
|- bgcolor="ffbbbb"
| 70 || June 25 || @ Red Sox || 1–6 || Cho || Snyder (7–6) || Guthrie || 31,097 || 35–35
|- bgcolor="ffbbbb"
| 71 || June 26 || @ Red Sox || 1–17 || Martinez || Baldwin (3–8) || Wasdin || 32,758 || 35–36
|- bgcolor="ccffcc"
| 72 || June 27 || @ Red Sox || 7–6 || Simas (2–2) || Wakefield || Howry (13) || 30,627 || 36–36
|- bgcolor="ffbbbb"
| 73 || June 28 || @ Red Sox || 1–14 || Saberhagen || Sirotka (6–8) || — || 24,616 || 36–37
|- bgcolor="ffbbbb"
| 74 || June 29 || @ Royals || 4–7 || Appier || Navarro (6–6) || Service || 15,027 || 36–38
|- bgcolor="ccffcc"
| 75 || June 30 || @ Royals || 10–9 (10) || Howry (1–1) || Service || — || 14,026 || 37–38
|-

|- bgcolor="ccffcc"
| 76 || July 1 || @ Royals || 6–2 || Baldwin (4–8) || Pisciotta || — || 18,697 || 38–38
|- bgcolor="ffbbbb"
| 77 || July 2 || Red Sox || 1–6 || Martinez || Parque (8–6) || — || 23,266 || 38–39
|- bgcolor="ccffcc"
| 78 || July 3 || Red Sox || 11–2 || Sirotka (7–8) || Rose || — || 18,028 || 39–39
|- bgcolor="ffbbbb"
| 79 || July 4 || Red Sox || 2–5 || Saberhagen || Navarro (6–7) || Wakefield || 16,495 || 39–40
|- bgcolor="ffbbbb"
| 80 || July 6 || Royals || 7–8 (10) || Whisenant || Foulke (0–2) || — || 11,251 || 39–41
|- bgcolor="ccffcc"
| 81 || July 7 || Royals || 7–1 || Parque (9–6) || Suzuki || — || 11,963 || 40–41
|- bgcolor="ccffcc"
| 82 || July 8 || Royals || 6–5 || Foulke (1–2) || Byrdak || — || 14,738 || 41–41
|- bgcolor="ccffcc"
| 83 || July 9 || Cubs || 3–2 || Howry (2–1) || Adams || — || 44,153 || 42–41
|- bgcolor="ffbbbb"
| 84 || July 10 || Cubs || 2–10 || Lieber || Navarro (6–8) || — || 44,008 || 42–42
|- bgcolor="ffbbbb"
| 85 || July 11 || Cubs || 3–6 || Trachsel || Baldwin (4–9) || Adams || 43,115 || 42–43
|- bgcolor="ffbbbb"
| 86 || July 15 || @ Cardinals || 2–3 (13) || Croushore || Rizzo (0–1) || — || 40,258 || 42–44
|- bgcolor="ccffcc"
| 87 || July 16 || @ Cardinals || 9–8 || Navarro (7–8) || Acevedo || Howry (14) || 46,909 || 43–44
|- bgcolor="ffbbbb"
| 88 || July 17 || @ Cardinals || 6–8 || Stephenson || Ward (0–1) || Bottalico || 48,650 || 43–45
|- bgcolor="ffbbbb"
| 89 || July 18 || @ Brewers || 4–5 || Plunk || Rizzo (0–2) || — || 27,295 || 43–46
|- bgcolor="ccffcc"
| 90 || July 19 || @ Brewers || 10–8 (12) || Simas (3–2) || Coppinger || Foulke (4) || 33,250 || 44–46
|- bgcolor="ffbbbb"
| 91 || July 20 || @ Brewers || 4–5 || Plunk || Lowe (3–1) || Wickman || 20,342 || 44–47
|- bgcolor="ccffcc"
| 92 || July 21 || @ Twins || 6–3 (10) || Simas (4–2) || Carrasco || Howry (15) || 12,399 || 45–47
|- bgcolor="ffbbbb"
| 93 || July 22 || @ Twins || 0–3 || Mays || Baldwin (4–10) || Trombley || 12,397 || 45–48
|- bgcolor="ffbbbb"
| 94 || July 23 || Blue Jays || 1–2 || Hamilton || Parque (9–7) || Koch || 14,166 || 45–49
|- bgcolor="ccffcc"
| 95 || July 24 || Blue Jays || 6–5 || Eyre (1–0) || Escobar || Howry (16) || 25,674 || 46–49
|- bgcolor="ffbbbb"
| 96 || July 25 || Blue Jays || 3–11 || Carpenter || Sirotka (7–9) || — || 18,299 || 46–50
|- bgcolor="ffbbbb"
| 97 || July 26 || Blue Jays || 3–4 (11) || Frascatore || Howry (2–2) || Koch || 17,631 || 46–51
|- bgcolor="ffbbbb"
| 98 || July 27 || Yankees || 3–5 || Hernandez || Baldwin (4–11) || Rivera || 21,364 || 46–52
|- bgcolor="ccffcc"
| 99 || July 28 || Yankees || 11–3 || Castillo (1–0) || Pettitte || — || 22,523 || 47–52
|- bgcolor="ccffcc"
| 100 || July 29 || Yankees || 5–1 || Snyder (8–6) || Cone || Foulke (5) || 24,056 || 48–52
|- bgcolor="ffbbbb"
| 101 || July 30 || @ Indians || 2–10 || Colon || Sirotka (7–10) || — || 43,181 || 48–53
|- bgcolor="ffbbbb"
| 102 || July 31 || @ Indians || 10–13 || Shuey || Castillo (1–1) || Jackson || 43,209 || 48–54
|-

|- bgcolor="ccffcc"
| 103 || August 1 || @ Indians || 6–3 || Baldwin (5–11) || Nagy || Howry (17) || 43,067 || 49–54
|- bgcolor="ccffcc"
| 104 || August 2 || @ Tigers || 6–2 || Wells (1–0) || Moehler || — || 26,637 || 50–54
|- bgcolor="ccffcc"
| 105 || August 3 || @ Tigers || 9–6 || Snyder (9–6) || Thompson || Howry (18) || 24,484 || 51–54
|- bgcolor="ffbbbb"
| 106 || August 5 || @ Athletics || 6–7 (11) || Mathews || Eyre (1–1) || — || 9,305 || 51–55
|- bgcolor="ffbbbb"
| 107 || August 6 || @ Athletics || 1–9 || Heredia || Navarro (7–9) || — || 11,267 || 51–56
|- bgcolor="ffbbbb"
| 108 || August 7 || @ Athletics || 1–11 || Appier || Parque (9–8) || — || 26,091 || 51–57
|- bgcolor="ffbbbb"
| 109 || August 8 || @ Athletics || 5–7 || Jones || Foulke (1–3) || — || 22,821 || 51–58
|- bgcolor="ffbbbb"
| 110 || August 9 || @ Mariners || 4–6 || Meche || Snyder (9–7) || Mesa || 42,978 || 51–59
|- bgcolor="ffbbbb"
| 111 || August 10 || @ Mariners || 3–4 || Moyer || Howry (2–3) || — || 43,696 || 51–60
|- bgcolor="ffbbbb"
| 112 || August 11 || @ Mariners || 2–11 || Abbott || Navarro (7–10) || — || 45,194 || 51–61
|- bgcolor="ccffcc"
| 113 || August 13 || Rangers || 4–2 || Wells (2–0) || Burkett || Howry (19) || — || 52–61
|- bgcolor="ccffcc"
| 114 || August 13 || Rangers || 7–4 || Baldwin (6–11) || Glynn || — || 20,444 || 53–61
|- bgcolor="ccffcc"
| 115 || August 14 || Rangers || 8–7 || Howry (3–3) || Zimmerman || — || 27,476 || 54–61
|- bgcolor="ffbbbb"
| 116 || August 15 || Rangers || 0–10 || Loaiza || Snyder (9–8) || — || 22,708 || 54–62
|- bgcolor="ccffcc"
| 117 || August 16 || Angels || 6–1 || Sirotka (8–10) || Washburn || — || 18,212 || 55–62
|- bgcolor="ccffcc"
| 118 || August 17 || Angels || 4–3 (12) || Howry (4–3) || Holtz || — || 14,943 || 56–62
|- bgcolor="ccffcc"
| 119 || August 18 || Angels || 4–3 || Baldwin (7–11) || Magnante || Howry (20) || 11,666 || 57–62
|- bgcolor="ffbbbb"
| 120 || August 19 || Angels || 2–9 || Ortiz || Parque (9–9) || — || 14,171 || 57–63
|- bgcolor="ccffcc"
| 121 || August 21 || @ Orioles || 4–3 || Simas (5–2) || Reyes || Howry (21) || 42,901 || 58–63
|- bgcolor="ccffcc"
| 122 || August 21 || @ Orioles || 8–5 (10) || Howry (5–3) || Johns || Foulke (6) || 47,735 || 59–63
|- bgcolor="ffbbbb"
| 123 || August 22 || @ Orioles || 4–9 || Johns || Navarro (7–11) || — || 43,335 || 59–64
|- bgcolor="ccffcc"
| 124 || August 23 || @ Devil Rays || 10–2 || Baldwin (8–11) || Witt || — || 15,386 || 60–64
|- bgcolor="ffbbbb"
| 125 || August 24 || @ Devil Rays || 5–6 || Alvarez || Parque (9–10) || Hernandez || 15,425 || 60–65
|- bgcolor="ccffcc"
| 126 || August 25 || @ Devil Rays || 6–1 || Foulke (2–3) || Rupe || — || 15,468 || 61–65
|- bgcolor="ffbbbb"
| 127 || August 26 || @ Devil Rays || 7–9 || White || Snyder (9–9) || Hernandez || 16,475 || 61–66
|- bgcolor="ffbbbb"
| 128 || August 27 || Athletics || 6–9 || Olivares || Sirotka (8–11) || Isringhausen || 14,270 || 61–67
|- bgcolor="ffbbbb"
| 129 || August 28 || Athletics || 5–7 || Heredia || Navarro (7–12) || Jones || 27,121 || 61–68
|- bgcolor="ccffcc"
| 130 || August 29 || Athletics || 7–2 || Baldwin (9–11) || Appier || Foulke (7) || 16,403 || 62–68
|- bgcolor="ffbbbb"
| 131 || August 30 || Mariners || 2–5 || Garcia || Parque (9–11) || Mesa || — || 62–69
|- bgcolor="ffbbbb"
| 132 || August 30 || Mariners || 6–14 || Cloude || Castillo (1–2) || Rodriguez || 17,190 || 62–70
|- bgcolor="ffbbbb"
| 133 || August 31 || Mariners || 4–11 || Halama || Snyder (9–10) || — || 12,579 || 62–71
|-

|- bgcolor="ffbbbb"
| 134 || September 1 || Mariners || 2–3 || Meche || Sirotka (8–12) || Mesa || 12,472 || 62–72
|- bgcolor="ffbbbb"
| 135 || September 3 || @ Rangers || 4–10 || Burkett || Baldwin (9–12) || — || 29,266 || 62–73
|- bgcolor="ccffcc"
| 136 || September 4 || @ Rangers || 12–3 || Castillo (2–2) || Loaiza || — || 29,279 || 63–73
|- bgcolor="ffbbbb"
| 137 || September 6 || @ Rangers || 6–8 || Helling || Parque (9–12) || Wetteland || — || 63–74
|- bgcolor="ffbbbb"
| 138 || September 6 || @ Rangers || 3–6 || Fassero || Snyder (9–11) || Wetteland || 31,443 || 63–75
|- bgcolor="ffbbbb"
| 139 || September 7 || @ Angels || 1–14 || Cooper || Sirotka (8–13) || — || 16,867 || 63–76
|- bgcolor="ffbbbb"
| 140 || September 8 || @ Angels || 5–6 (10) || Percival || Simas (5–3) || — || 17,246 || 63–77
|- bgcolor="ffbbbb"
| 141 || September 10 || Indians || 6–14 || Colon || Wells (2–1) || — || 19,132 || 63–78
|- bgcolor="ffbbbb"
| 142 || September 11 || Indians || 3–4 || Burba || Parque (9–13) || Jackson || 34,400 || 63–79
|- bgcolor="ccffcc"
| 143 || September 12 || Indians || 4–3 || Sirotka (9–13) || Wright || Howry (22) || 20,481 || 64–79
|- bgcolor="ffbbbb"
| 144 || September 13 || Tigers || 2–3 || Mlicki || Snyder (9–12) || Jones || 12,217 || 64–80
|- bgcolor="ffbbbb"
| 145 || September 14 || Tigers || 0–7 || Nitkowski || Myette (0–1) || — || 11,475 || 64–81
|- bgcolor="ccffcc"
| 146 || September 15 || Tigers || 3–1 || Baldwin (10–12) || Moehler || Foulke (8) || 11,528 || 65–81
|- bgcolor="ccffcc"
| 147 || September 17 || @ Blue Jays || 7–3 || Wells (3–1) || Escobar || — || 30,743 || 66–81
|- bgcolor="ccffcc"
| 148 || September 18 || @ Blue Jays || 7–4 || Navarro (8–12) || Quantrill || Howry (23) || 28,260 || 67–81
|- bgcolor="ccffcc"
| 149 || September 19 || @ Blue Jays || 3–2 || Sirotka (10–13) || Halladay || Howry (24) || 27,120 || 68–81
|- bgcolor="ffbbbb"
| 150 || September 21 || @ Yankees || 1–3 || Pettitte || Baldwin (10–13) || Rivera || 29,248 || 68–82
|- bgcolor="ffbbbb"
| 151 || September 22 || @ Yankees || 4–5 || Rivera || Navarro (8–13) || — || 27,549 || 68–83
|- bgcolor="ffbbbb"
| 152 || September 23 || @ Yankees || 2–5 || Clemens || Parque (9–14) || Rivera || 33,586 || 68–84
|- bgcolor="ffbbbb"
| 153 || September 24 || @ Twins || 2–6 || Mays || Myette (0–2) || — || 11,308 || 68–85
|- bgcolor="ccffcc"
| 154 || September 25 || @ Twins || 13–4 || Sirotka (11–13) || Hawkins || — || 26,324 || 69–85
|- bgcolor="ccffcc"
| 155 || September 26 || @ Twins || 3–0 || Baldwin (11–13) || Ryan || Howry (25) || 11,947 || 70–85
|- bgcolor="ccffcc"
| 156 || September 27 || @ Twins || 3–1 || Simas (6–3) || Wells || Foulke (9) || 9,022 || 71–85
|- bgcolor="ffbbbb"
| 157 || September 29 || Red Sox || 2–6 || Mercker || Parque (9–15) || — || — || 71–86
|- bgcolor="ccffcc"
| 158 || September 29 || Red Sox || 4–2 || Foulke (3–3) || Gordon || Howry (26) || 12,974 || 72–86
|- bgcolor="ccffcc"
| 159 || September 30 || Red Sox || 5–2 || Lowe (4–1) || Rose || Howry (27) || 12,788 || 73–86
|-

|- bgcolor="ccffcc"
| 160 || October 1 || Twins || 9–8 || Baldwin (12–13) || Ryan || Howry (28) || 11,887 || 74–86
|- bgcolor="ccffcc"
| 161 || October 2 || Twins || 6–1 || Wells (4–1) || Perkins || — || 17,904 || 75–86
|- bgcolor="ffffff"
| 162 || October 3 || Twins || 1–1 (7) ||  ||  || — || 18,694 || 75–86
|-

|-
| Legend:       = Win       = Loss       = TieBold = Chicago White Sox team member

Record vs. opponents

Detailed records

1999 Opening Day lineup 

Ray Durham, 2B

Mike Caruso, SS

Frank Thomas, 1B

Paul Konerko, DH

Magglio Ordóñez, RF

Greg Norton, 3B

Jeff Abbott, LF

Darrin Jackson, CF

Brook Fordyce, C

James Baldwin, P

Roster

Player stats

Batting 
Note: G = Games played; AB = At bats; R = Runs scored; H = Hits; 2B = Doubles; 3B = Triples; HR = Home runs; RBI = Runs batted in; BB = Base on balls; SO = Strikeouts; AVG = Batting average; SB = Stolen bases

Pitching 
Note: W = Wins; L = Losses; ERA = Earned run average; G = Games pitched; GS = Games started; SV = Saves; IP = Innings pitched; H = Hits allowed; R = Runs allowed; ER = Earned runs allowed; HR = Home runs allowed; BB = Walks allowed; K = Strikeouts

Farm system 

LEAGUE CHAMPIONS: Charlotte, Burlington

References

External links 
 1999 Chicago White Sox at Baseball Reference

Chicago White Sox seasons
Chicago White Sox season
Chicago White Sox